Brett Engelhardt (born August 12, 1980, in Sheboygan, Wisconsin) is an American former professional ice hockey forward who last played for EHC Liwest Black Wings Linz of the Erste Bank Eishockey Liga (EBEL).

Playing career
After playing four seasons with the Michigan Tech Huskies, he began his professional career with the Philadelphia Phantoms organization. Having started the next season in the ECHL, he joined the St. Johns Maple Leafs. He followed the team when it moved to Toronto to become the Marlies. Before the beginning of the 2007-08 season, he signed a contract with the Detroit Red Wings. He did not make the team in training camp and joined the Grand Rapids Griffins. In February 2008, the Red Wings traded him to the Montreal Canadiens for center Francis Lemieux.

On May 8, 2008, Engelhardt signed a contract with German team, Augsburger Panther of the DEL for the 2008–09 season. After scoring a modest 35 points in his first season, Brett broke out offensively the following year leading the Panthers with 28 goals and scoring 54 points in only 47 games. On June 28, 2010, he then signed with fellow DEL team, the Hamburg Freezers to a one-year contract.

Career statistics

References

External links
 

Augsburger Panther players
Grand Rapids Griffins players
Hamburg Freezers players
Hamilton Bulldogs (AHL) players
Philadelphia Phantoms players
St. John's Maple Leafs players
Toronto Marlies players
Green Bay Gamblers players
Gwinnett Gladiators players
Michigan Tech Huskies men's ice hockey players
American men's ice hockey right wingers
Sportspeople from Sheboygan, Wisconsin
1980 births
Living people
Ice hockey players from Wisconsin
USA Hockey National Team Development Program players